Chapter Two: Hasta Siempre is a studio album by Argentine tenor saxophonist and composer Gato Barbieri. It was released in 1974 by Impulse! Records. The album was re-released in 1997 as part of Latino America, a double CD that also included the album Chapter One: Latin America along with unreleased tracks.

Reception
The Allmusic review by Thom Jurek awarded the album 4 stars stating "It's a stunner and will leave any interested listener breathless by its finish".

Track listing
All compositions by Gato Barbieri, except Juana Azurduy by Félix Luna / Ariel Ramírez
 "Encontros, Part One" - 2:16   
 "Encontros, Part Three" - 4:16   
 "Latino America" - 5:30   
 "Marissea" - 7:39   
 "Para Nosotros" - 8:02   
 "Juana Azurduy" - 11:21  
Recorded in at Music Hall Studios in Buenos Aires, Argentina on April 17, 1973 (track 6); at Odeon Studios in Rio de Janeiro, Brazil on April 28, 1973 (tracks 1, 2 & 4), and at The Village Recorder in Los Angeles, California, on October 16, 1973 (track 3) and October 17, 1973 (track 5).

Personnel
Gato Barbieri - tenor saxophone
Helio Delmiro, Quelo Palacios - acoustic guitar
Ricardo Lew - electric guitar
Daudeth De Azevado - cavaco
Adalberto Cevasco, Jim Hughart, Novelli  - electric bass
Paulo Antonio Braga, Pocho Lapuble - drums
Jorge Padin, El Zurdo Roizner - percussion
Mayuto Correa - conga, triangle
Domingo Cura - bombo legüero
Isoca Fumero - charango
Raul Mercado - quena
Amadeo Monges - arpa India
Antonio Pantoja - anapa, erke, siku, quena, erkencho
Unidentified percussion section - surdo, tambourine, pandeiro, cuica, agogô

References

Impulse! Records albums
Gato Barbieri albums
1974 albums